Emil Pagliarulo is an American video game designer.

Career
Emil started his career writing for the website Adrenaline Vault. He has been working for Bethesda Softworks since 2002.  He previously worked for Looking Glass Studios and Ion Storm Austin. He was the lead designer and the lead writer of Fallout 3, for which he received the Best Writing award at the 2008 Game Developers Choice Awards. He was credited as the senior designer and writer of The Elder Scrolls V: Skyrim and Fallout 4.

Video game credits

 Thief II: The Metal Age (2000)
 The Elder Scrolls III: Bloodmoon (2003)
 The Elder Scrolls IV: Oblivion (2006)
 Fallout 3 (2008)
 The Elder Scrolls V: Skyrim (2011)
 Fallout Shelter (2015)
 Fallout 4 (2015)
 Fallout 76 (2018)
 Starfield (2023)

References

External links
 Profile at MobyGames

Year of birth missing (living people)
American video game designers
Bethesda Softworks employees
Fallout (series) developers
Living people
Place of birth missing (living people)